Human is the nineteenth studio album by Rod Stewart released on 12 March 2001. It was Stewart's first, and only release on Atlantic Records. It produced the singles "Run Back Into Your Arms", "I Can't Deny It", "Soul On Soul" and "Don't Come Around Here" with "I Can't Deny It" became a moderate hit, peaking at number 26 in the United Kingdom, Stewart's most recent Top 40 to date in that chart. The album was certified gold by the British Phonographic Industry. Human was also his first album not to feature an original Stewart track.  On the third track, "Don’t Come Around Here", Stewart is joined by Helicopter Girl.

Track listing

Notes
  signifies an additional producer
  signifies an additional vocal producer
  signifies a lead vocal producer
  signifies a lead vocal producer

Personnel 
 Rod Stewart – vocals
 Steve Pigott – keyboards (5, 6, 8), bass (6, 8)
 Chris Pelcer – keyboards (6, 8), bass (6, 8)
 Slash – guitars (1)
 Robbie McIntosh – guitars (5, 6)
 Mark Knopfler – guitar solo (6)
 Jesse Johnson – guitars (8)
 Pino Palladino – bass (5)
 Nick Richards – drum programming (5, 6, 8), percussion (5, 6, 8)
 Robyn Smith – string arrangements and conductor (3)
 Toby Chapman – string arrangements (10)
 Gary Wallis – string arrangements (10)
 Gavyn Wright – string conductor and leader (10)
 Simon Hale – string transcriptions (10)
 The London Session Orchestra – orchestra (3, 10)
 Helicopter Girl – vocals (3)
 Connor Reeves – backing vocals (5)
 Alexandra Brown – backing vocals (6)
 Carl Carwell – backing vocals (6)
 Sue Ann Carwell – backing vocals (6, 8, 11)
 Jeff Pescetto – backing vocals (6)
 Jackie Simley-Stevens – backing vocals (6, 11)
 Yvonne Williams – backing vocals (6, 11)
 Danielle Brisebois – backing vocals (11)
 Joe Turano – backing vocals (11)

Production 
 Rob Dickins – executive producer
 Neil Aldridge – recording (1)
 André Hortsmann – recording (1)
 Sam Noel – recording (2, 4, 7)
 Steve Price – engineer (3)
 Simon Hurrell – lead vocal recording (4, 7), recording (5, 6, 8)
 Roger Sommers – recording (9)
 Walter Turbitt – guitars and bass recording (10)
 Chris Brown – recording (11)
 Ed Colman – recording (11)
 Moe El-Khamlichi – recording (11)
 Avril Mackintosh – Pro Tools engineer (11)
 Meredith Leung – recording assistant (1)
 Richard Wilkinson – recording assistant (1)
 Dave Way – mixing (1, 4-8)
 Keith Uddin – mix assistant (1, 4-8)
 Dennis Charles – mixing (2), remixing (4, 7)
 Niven Garland – mixing (2), remixing (4, 7)
 Mark Taylor – mixing (3, 10)
 Steve Churchyard – mixing (9), recording (11)
 Michael H. Brauer – mixing (11)
 Stewart Whitmore – digital editing 
 Stephen Marcussen – mastering
 Marcussen Mastering (Hollywood, California) – editing and mastering location 
 Richard Bates – art direction 
 Andrea Brooks – art direction, design 
 Tony Duran – photography 
 Arnold Stiefel and Annie Challis – management

Charts

References

External links
http://www.rodstewartfanclub.com/about_rod/disco/album_detail.php?album_id=14 
 

Rod Stewart albums
2001 albums
Atlantic Records albums
Albums with cover art by Tony Duran
Albums produced by Brian Rawling
Albums recorded at Olympic Sound Studios